The Douglas Breakwater Crane Railway was a massive self-propelled steam block-setting crane, with a capacity of 15 tons, built by Stothert & Pitt of Bath that ran the length of the original breakwater at Douglas, also used for the loading and unloading of vessels. 

A later crane was built by Cowans, Sheldon of Carlisle (capacity 25 tons; carried on two four-wheel bogies; Works number 9057 of 1948 to Drawing 18087). The crane was owned by the Isle of Man Harbour Board and ran on  gauge.

References

Douglas, Isle of Man
Railway lines in the Isle of Man
Individual cranes (machines)
10 ft gauge railways